Saqer Mohammed (Arabic:صقر محمد) (born 22 May 1991) is an Emirati footballer.

External links

References

Emirati footballers
1991 births
Living people
Hatta Club players
Al Ain FC players
Al-Ittihad Kalba SC players
Association football midfielders
UAE First Division League players
UAE Pro League players